The Ibusuki volcanic field, also known as the Ibusuki Volcano or Ibusuki Volcanic Group, is an area of current volcanic and geothermal activity at the tip of the  Satsuma Peninsula,  Kagoshima prefecture, Kyushu, Japan. It is administered as part of Ibusuki City and Kirishima-Kinkowan National Park.

Geology

It is at the eastern margins of the Ata Caldera and has been estimated to contain  of volcanic material. The Ibusuki volcanic field includes the following recent active volcanoes and their vents:
Mount Kaimon stratovolcano 
Last erupted in 885 CE
Mizunashi maar 
Erupted about 2090 BCE
Kagami maar 
Erupted about 2090 BCE
Kasagadake lava dome
Erupted about 5000 BCE
Tsujinodake lava dome 
Erupted about 6000 BCE
Washiodake lava dome 
Erupted about 10000 BCE
Nabeshimadake lava dome 
Formed about 2,800 years ago
Ikeda Caldera 
Present caldera was formed 4800 years ago
Kiyomidake lava dome  
Erupted about 8000 BCE
Karayama stratovolcano 
Erupted about 23000 BCE
Ikezoko maar 
Last erupted more recently than 4800 years ago
Unagi maar 
Last erupted more recently than 4800 years ago
Narikawa maar
Last erupted more recently than 4800 years ago 
Yamagawa maar 
Last erupted pumice more recently than 4800 years ago

Geothermal

There are 800 about hot springs concentrated within 5 km of the sea at the southeastern tip of the Satsuma Peninsula.  The relatively recently commissioned Yamagawa Binary Power Station (4990 kW) uses local geothermal power.

Tectonics

The north western sector of the zone is limited by the Onkadobira fault scarp. which has been interpreted as part of the rim of the Ata Caldera.

Risk

The field has both tectonic and volcanic risks. With regard to volcanic risks it has been noted that currently we are in the longest period between eruptions for the last 4000 years. Earthquake swarms that do not appear to be related to the volcanoes have been described.

References 
 

Ibusuki, Kagoshima
Mountains of Kagoshima Prefecture
Volcanoes of Kagoshima Prefecture
Volcanoes of Kyushu